The 2014 Open d'Orléans was a professional tennis tournament played on hard courts. It was the tenth edition of the tournament which was part of the 2014 ATP Challenger Tour. It took place in Orléans, France between 22 and 28 September 2014.

Singles main-draw entrants

Seeds

 1 Rankings are as of September 15, 2014.

Other entrants
The following players received wildcards into the singles main draw:
  Philipp Kohlschreiber
  Tristan Lamasine
  Enzo Couacaud
  Laurent Lokoli

The following players received entry as an alternate into the singles main draw:
  David Guez

The following players received entry from the qualifying draw:
  Grégoire Barrère
  Michael Lammer
  Denis Matsukevich
  Artem Sitak

Champions

Singles

 Sergiy Stakhovsky def.  Thomaz Bellucci, 6–2, 7–5

Doubles

 Thomaz Bellucci /  André Sá def.  James Cerretani /  Andreas Siljeström, 5–7, 6–4, [10–8]

External links
Official Website